Enteng ng Ina Mo is a 2011 Filipino fantasy comedy parody and action film starring Vic Sotto and Ai-Ai delas Alas. It is a joint production by Star Cinema, M-Zet Productions, APT Entertainment and OctoArts Films and is a cross-over to the Enteng Kabisote and Tanging Ina series. It is an official entry to the 2011 Metro Manila Film Festival and was released on December 25, 2011.

The movie is the last installment of Ang Tanging Ina film series and the eighth movie installment based on the sitcom, Okay Ka, Fairy Ko!.

Synopsis
Enteng Kabisote (Vic Sotto) wants to retire as the perennial hero of Engkantasya and have a normal life with his family without the magical elements. Ina Montecillo (Ai-Ai delas Alas) longs to have the right partner to be with her for the rest of her life.

One day, Enteng is placed under a powerful evil spell by Engkantasya's evil fairy Satana to fall in love with another woman. And when he meets Ina, he exerts all the effort Ina to fall for him. Ina, on the other hand, slowly opens her heart for this new opportunity of love.

Enteng then tries his best to be a father to Ina's children even if they are not fully supportive of him. But when their relationship gets serious, Ina discovers the truth – Enteng already has a family.

After discovering the truth of Enteng's family and the evil spell cast upon Enteng was worn off, Ina's family teamed up with Enteng's family to fight off Satana and her minions for what she had done as Ina Magenta gives Ina Montecillo some of their powers to fight her.

After defeating Satana as they celebrate their victory, both Enteng and Ina set their differences and became friends. However at the arrival of both Tirso "Pip" Montecillo (Alwyn Uytingco) and Aiza Kabisote (Aiza Seguerra), both Enteng and Ina scolds them for being late and to their horrible shock that Pip accidentally impregnates Aiza during their schedules in late nights (The same scene where Pip accidentally impregnates the woman he did not met while in a drunken state and had a daughter named Monay) and both were comically shocked that they will become grandparents to Aiza's unborn child making themselves as both father and mother in-law to both Aiza and Pip do it Together have families.

Cast

Kabisote family
 Vic Sotto as Enteng Kabisote
 Gwen Zamora as Faye Kabisote
 Aiza Seguerra as Aiza Kabisote
 Oyo Boy Sotto as Benok Kabisote
 Amy Perez as Ina Magenta
 Bing Loyzaga as Satana/Ina Amarillo 
 Ruby Rodriguez as Amy
 Jose Manalo as Bodyguard Jose
 Mikylla Ramirez as Ada Kabisote
 Wally Bayola as Bodyguard Boggart
 Paolo Ballesteros as Gay Lover
 Pauleen Luna as Sexy Waitress 
 Megan Young as Ina Azul
 Precious Lara Quigaman as Ina Berde 
 Fritz Ynfante as Doctor Fairy 
 Ciara Sotto as Trainors 
 Gian Sotto 
 Wahoo Sotto 
 Jerome Galica 
 Gerard Acao as Mariahouit 
 Thou Reyes as Danolla

Montecillo family
 Ai-Ai delas Alas as Ina Montecillo
 Marvin Agustin as Juan Montecillo (Ina Motecillo Eldest's Son)
 Nikki Valdez as Getrudis "Tudis" Montecillo
 Carlo Aquino as Dimitri "Tri" Montecillo
 Alwyn Uytingco as Tirso "Pip" Montecillo
 Xyriel Manabat as Monay Montecillo
 Eugene Domingo as Rowena (special participation)
 Owie Boy Gapuz as Ogie Boy Montecillo
 Jon Avila as Frank
 Heart Evangelista as Portia "Por" Montecillo  (mentioned only) 
 Empoy Marquez as William (Seven's Husband)
 Cecil Paz as Malena
 Shaina Magdayao as Severina "Seven" Montecillo (mentioned only)
 Erika Padilla as Nora, Pip's Ex-partner, Mother of Monay Montecillo
 Piolo Pascual as PSG Carlito

Awards

Release

Box office
The film captured the number one spot on the first day of 2011 Metro Manila Film Festival box office race with a whooping ₱38.5 million gross well ahead of the runners-up, Ang Panday 2 and Segunda Mano with ₱20 million and ₱18.25 million gross respectively.

During its opening day, the film grossed over ₱38.5 million nationwide making it as the highest-grossing film on its first day of all-time in the Philippines breaking the records of Spider-Man and Avatar. On its second day, the movie total gross is ₱69 million. It is higher than Ang Panday 2, with ₱38 million and Segunda Mano with ₱35 million. On its third day, (according to MMFF committee) Enteng ng Ina Mo grossed 91.9 million. Enteng ng Ina Mo breaks the 4-day record of The Unkabogable Praybeyt Benjamin (₱109 million) with a record of ₱110 million. After 4 weeks of showing, the film grossed P 237 million and became the third highest-grossing Filipino film of all time and highest-grossing MMFF film of all time.

Reception
The film was graded "B" by the Cinema Evaluation Board of the Philippines.

Antonio Siegfrid O. Alegado of Business World described that the film could have been better had it not been hampered by poor editing as it was clear that the fusion of the families of Enteng and Ina was done in rather sloppy fashion. The film, however, was saved by the Tanging Ina cast thanks to nice performances.

Mark Angelo Ching of PEP.ph gave the film a stronger review and described it as "the perfect mix of humor and fantasy that MMFF moviegoers look for year after year." The review also noted the solid performances of Gwen Zamora, Xyriel Manabat, and Thou Reyes.

In regards to the film's concept of doing a cinematic crossover of two established characters, Philbert Ortiz Dy stated that "filmmakers were content to just have the two big stars together on screen, giving them dialogue from other movies and pushing towards some ridiculous adventure climax".

Trivia
 The Kabisote family recognized Ina as the former president. They are referring to the movie, Ang Tanging Ina N'yong Lahat, when Ina became the president.
 This is also the Vic Sotto's second project under Star Cinema in 2011 after Pak! Pak! My Dr. Kwak! and his fourth overall project with Star Cinema since Hindi Pa Tapos Ang Labada Darling in 1994 and Biyudo si Daddy, Biyuda si Mommy in 1997.
 Also the reunion of Ai-Ai delas Alas and Vic Sotto after the success of the movie of Bakit ba ganyan? (Ewan ko nga ba, Darling) (2000)
The last scene where Pip accidentally impregnates Aiza to the horrible surprise of both Enteng and Ina is a reference of how Pip had a daughter named Monay in the third and final film of Ang Tanging Ina Mo (Last na 'To!) where he accidentally impregnates his best friend.

See also
 Okay Ka, Fairy Ko! (film series)
 Ang Tanging Ina (film series)

References

External links
Official website

Enteng Kabisote
2011 films
Philippine crossover films
Philippine parody films
2010s fantasy adventure films
Philippine fantasy adventure films
2010s Tagalog-language films
Star Cinema films
OctoArts Films films
APT Entertainment films
M-Zet Productions films
Philippine sequel films
2010s parody films
2010s English-language films
Films directed by Tony Y. Reyes